The intersegmental arteries are a set of 30 arteries arising from the embryonic dorsal aorta, with each artery providing blood supply to one somite and its derivatives.

Cervical intersegmental arteries 
The cervical intersegmental arteries merge into the vertebral artery with the exception of the 7th (or possibly the 6th) cervical intersegmental artery, which becomes the subclavian artery. The confusion arises because the vertebral artery drains into the subclavian artery following the disappearance of the dorsal aortae in part of the cervical region.

Thoracic intersegmental arteries 
The thoracic intersegmental arteries all develop into the intercostal arteries.

Lumbar intersegmental arteries 
The lumbar intersegmental arteries develop into the lumbar arteries, with the exception of the 5th (last) lumbar intersegmental artery, which becomes the common iliac arteries.

Sacral intersegmental arteries 
These arteries merge into the lateral sacral artery.

References 

Arteries